Sophia Oboshie Doku was a Ghanaian female politician and one of the first female parliamentarians in the First Parliament of the First Republic of Ghana under Ghana's first President Dr Kwame Nkrumah.

Education
Doku was trained as a teacher.

Politics
Doku was a political activist who served under various capacities and one of the Independent struggle activist.

See also
Ama Nkrumah
Hannah Cudjoe
Susanna Al-Hassan

References

20th-century Ghanaian women politicians
Year of birth missing (living people)
Year of death missing
Living people
Ghanaian politicians